Anna Floris (born 15 May 1982) is a retired tennis player from Italy.

In her career, she won 12 singles and 16 doubles titles on the ITF Women's Circuit. On 16 August 2010, she reached her best singles ranking of world No. 129. On 9 March 2009, she peaked at No. 213 in the doubles rankings.

Floris won her first $50k tournament in October 2009 at the Torneo Internacional Femenino Villa de Madrid, defeating Dia Evtimova in the final.

Anna Floris retired from professional tennis 2016.

ITF Circuit finals

Singles (12–19)

Doubles (16–14)

References

External links
 
 

1982 births
Living people
Italian female tennis players
Place of birth missing (living people)
21st-century Italian women